Ammoniaphone was a voice improvement device invented by Dr. Carter Moffat. It was introduced in 1886.

Background. 

Moffat thought that the explanation that so many good singers came from Italy must have something to do with the air. When given the opportunity to travel to Italy (according to a newspaper clipping to solve a chemical problem of industrial importance – an assignment he completed so successfully that he was awarded a diploma of honor and a gold medal by the Italian government) he set about testing the air in Italy to reveal its secrets. He discovered that, along with traces of essential oils from herbs, Italian air contained considerable amounts of "peroxide of hydrogen", and "free ammonia". He then created a device that could reproduce this mixture and administer it in appropriate doses.

Ammoniaphone M812 is on permanent display at the Swedish Museum of Performing Arts / Scenkonstmuseet and Stiftelsen Musikkulturens Främjande .

References

External links

Inventions
Singing techniques